Bone Cabin Quarry is a dinosaur quarry that lay approximately  northwest of Laramie, Wyoming near historic Como Bluff. During the summer of 1897 Walter Granger, a paleontologist from the American Museum of Natural History, came upon a hillside littered with Jurassic period dinosaur bone fragments. Nearby was a sheepherder cabin built entirely out of fossil bones, hence the name "Bone Cabin Quarry." After Granger's discovery in late August 1897, the quarry was kept secret until early 1898, when the manpower could be amassed to undertake a full-scale excavation. Henry Fairfield Osborn, curator of the American Museum of Natural History headed the expedition. The bones of perfect skeletons lay thickly crowded. The excavation area was only . Bone Cabin Quarry was excavated from 1898 until 1905, when the productivity of specimens thinned. Some of the dinosaurs found at the Bone Cabin Quarry include Stegosaurus, Allosaurus and Apatosaurus. Gargoyleosaurus is also known from the Bone Cabin Quarry West locality.

The Ornithopod Species Dryosaurus altus is also present in the Bone Cabin Quarry.

From the Annual Field Report of the American Museum of Natural History, 1898:
On June 12th a rich strike was made in opening "Bone Cabin Quarry". This is where the larger part of the year's collection was secured. The work was arduous and additional help was needed. P. Kaisen was engaged at the end of June. The party stayed here until the close of the field season on October 1st.

An incomplete Brontosaurus skeleton was recovered.

See also
 List of fossil sites (with link directory)

References

Source

Further reading

External links

 
 
TGPP Photos
Google Maps

Jurassic geology of Wyoming
Morrison Formation
Paleontology in Wyoming
Jurassic paleontological sites of North America
1897 in paleontology